Ri Byong-uk (born November 7, 1954) is a retired North Korean boxer, who won two Olympic medals in the men's Light Flyweight (48 kg) category.

Olympic results 
1976
 Defeated Sidney McKnight (Canada) KO 1
 Defeated Henryk Średnicki (Poland) 3-2
 Defeated Armando Guevara (Venezuela) 3-2
 Defeated Payao Poontarat (Thailand) RSC 2
 Lost to Jorge Hernández (Cuba) 1-4

1980
 Defeated Henryk Pielesiak (Poland) 3-2
 Defeated Gilberto Sosa (Mexico) 3-2
 Defeated Dumitru Şchiopu (Romania) 4-1
 Lost to Shamil Sabirov (Soviet Union) 0-5

References
 

1954 births
Living people
Light-flyweight boxers
Boxers at the 1976 Summer Olympics
Boxers at the 1980 Summer Olympics
Olympic silver medalists for North Korea
Olympic bronze medalists for North Korea
Olympic boxers of North Korea
Olympic medalists in boxing
Medalists at the 1976 Summer Olympics
Medalists at the 1980 Summer Olympics
Boxers at the 1978 Asian Games
Asian Games silver medalists for North Korea
Asian Games medalists in boxing
North Korean male boxers
Medalists at the 1978 Asian Games
20th-century North Korean people